John Woodward (born 10 January 1949) is a Scottish former footballer.

Career
Born in Glasgow, Scotland, Woodward started his career with Possilpark YMCA before joining Arsenal in January 1966.

Woodward made his Arsenal debut on Wednesday 5 October 1966 in a 3–1 defeat to West Ham United in the League Cup 3rd Round at Highbury.

References

1949 births
Living people
Footballers from Glasgow
Scottish footballers
Association football defenders
Association football midfielders
Association football utility players
Arsenal F.C. players
York City F.C. players
English Football League players